Albert Hill may refer to:

 Albert E. Hill (1870–1933), American pro-labor politician
 Bertie Hill (Albert Edwin Hill, 1927–2005),] British Olympic equestrian
 Albert G. Hill (1910–1996), American physicist
 Albert Ross Hill (1868–1943), Canadian-born American educator
 Albert Hill (athlete) (1889–1969), British Olympic athlete
 Albert Hill (VC) (1895–1971), British Victoria Cross recipient
 Albert Hill (American football) (active 1896–1969), American college football quarterback

See also
 Al Hill (disambiguation)
 Hill (surname)